Tomac is a surname. Notable people with this surname include:

 Eli Tomac (born 1992), American motocross racer
 Eugen Tomac (born 1981), Romanian politician
 John Tomac (born 1967), American cyclist
 Marta Tomac (born 1990), Norwegian-Croatian handball player
 Mewen Tomac (born 2001), French swimmer
 Steve Tomac (born 1953), American politician
 Zdravko Tomac (1937–2020), Croatian politician
 Željko Tomac (born 1956), Croatian handball player

See also
 

Serbo-Croatian-language surnames